Christian Nicolay (born 4 March 1976 in Bassenheim) is a German javelin thrower. His personal best throw is 84.54 metres, achieved in May 2003 in Dessau.

Achievements

Seasonal bests by year
1994 - 72.48
1999 - 78.23
2000 - 80.19
2002 - 81.90
2003 - 84.54
2004 - 83.02
2005 - 83.20
2006 - 83.72
2007 - 79.58
2008 - 75.37
2009 - 76.25

External links 
 

1976 births
Living people
People from Mayen-Koblenz
German male javelin throwers
Sportspeople from Rhineland-Palatinate
German national athletics champions
Athletes (track and field) at the 2004 Summer Olympics
Olympic athletes of Germany